Atanasova Point (‘Nos Atanasova’ \'nos a-ta-'na-so-va\) is the ice-free tipped point on the north coast of Livingston Island projecting 450 m northwards into Hero Bay. It is named after Tsvetelina Atanasova (1960-2018), participant in the Bulgarian Antarctic campaigns in 2009/10 and subsequent seasons.

Location
British mapping in 1968, and Bulgarian in 2005, 2009 and 2017.

Maps
 L.L. Ivanov et al. Antarctica: Livingston Island and Greenwich Island, South Shetland Islands. Scale 1:100000 topographic map. Sofia: Antarctic Place-names Commission of Bulgaria, 2005.
 L.L. Ivanov. Antarctica: Livingston Island and Greenwich, Robert, Snow and Smith Islands. Scale 1:120000 topographic map.  Troyan: Manfred Wörner Foundation, 2009.
 Antarctic Digital Database (ADD). Scale 1:250000 topographic map of Antarctica. Scientific Committee on Antarctic Research (SCAR). Since 1993, regularly upgraded and updated

References
 Bulgarian Antarctic Gazetteer. Antarctic Place-names Commission. (details in Bulgarian, basic data in English)
 Atanasova Point. SCAR Composite Gazetteer of Antarctica

External links
 Atanasova Point. Copernix satellite image

Headlands of Livingston Island
Bulgaria and the Antarctic